Deathwatch is a role-playing game published in 2010 that uses the Warhammer 40,000 Roleplay system.

Description
Deathwatch has a martial focus. The player characters are loyalist Space Marines.

Gameplay
In Deathwatch, players take the role of surgically modified super humans known as Space Marines. These individuals are recruited from their native Chapters (fighting units of approximately 1,000 men) to serve as a military arm of the Inquisition, against particularly dangerous heretics and alien lifeforms.

Career paths
In Deathwatch, Space Marines are divided into groups based upon their individual abilities. In most campaigns the Squad Leader is either chosen by one of the players or is an NPC controlled by the GM.
Apothecary - Combat medic of Space Marine forces. Has a stim glove that allows him to distribute pain killers and extract gene seeds from fallen Space Marines.
Assault Marine - Close combat expert usually equipped with a jump pack, close-range and melee weapons.
Devastator Marine - Heavy weapons expert. Normally armed with a weapon like a lascannon or heavy bolter.
Librarian - Space Marine psyker. This is normally an individual who would qualify as a Sanctioned Psyker and also meets the indoctrination requirements for a specific Marine chapter.
Tactical Marine - The Space Marine "leaders". Specifically hones squad leadership abilities and is normally the Marine in charge.
Techmarine - Space Marine who is also a Tech-Priest of the Adeptus Mechanicus and thus can communicate with the Machine Spirits of the Imperium. Responsible for maintaining all equipment within the Deathwatch, including Dreadnoughts, powered armour, Terminator armor, and weapons.

Products
Deathwatch - Core Rulebook, including a pre-written adventure
The Game Master's Kit - A game master's screen for Deathwatch and a booklet that includes a pre-written adventure, and additional NPCs and antagonists
The Emperor Protects - An adventure anthology containing three adventures
Rites of Battle - A sourcebook including new character options, advanced specialties such as Chaplain, Chapter creation rules, weapons, armour and vehicle rules
Mark of the Xenos - A sourcebook of aliens, heretics, and daemons for use as foes
The Achilus Assault - A sourcebook covering the details of the Jericho Reach campaign area, the default setting for the Deathwatch RPG. The book provides extensive information for any Warhammer 40,000 RPG type campaign, leaning toward covering Deathwatch aspects.
First Founding - A sourcebook that adds the four remaining First Founding chapters not included in previous Deathwatch books. This book also includes new specialties, solo rules and allows Deathwatch Space Marines to have followers.
The Jericho Reach - A supplement that provides information on the Jericho Reach, includes a full adventure
Rising Tempest - An adventure in three parts for Deathwatch
Honour the Chapter - A supplement that provides information and character creation options for Chapters from the Second and subsequent Foundings
The Outer Reach - A supplement detailing the Dead Cabal and Necrons of the Suhbekhar dynasty
Ark of Lost Souls - A supplement that provides rules for Space Hulks, includes an adventure set on board an infamous Space Hulk
Emperor's Chosen - A supplement that focuses on Deathwatch veterans.

Development
Deathwatch, the third Fantasy Flight RPG based in the Warhammer 40,000 universe was officially announced on 26 February 2010.

Shannon Appelcline commented: "Deathwatch (2010), the third Warhammer 40k, finally allowed players the opportunity to play Space Marines – Space Marines that kill and kill and kill. Mechanically the game follows the core of Warhammer 40,000 Roleplay, with the biggest addition being 'demeanors' – another indie-like addition to the game that allows characters to get bonuses for following their character's core nature. Beyond that, characters were much more powerful than those in either of the previous games, with starting Space Marines being about the same power-level as the most powerful possible Acolytes from Dark Heresy. Some players have expressed concerns over the limited roleplay opportunities of a game so focused on killing but like the other Warhammer 40k Roleplay releases, Deathwatch appeal most to those players looking for the sort of play it allows."

References

Fantasy Flight Games games
Military role-playing games
Role-playing games based on works
Role-playing games introduced in 2010
Warhammer 40,000 tabletop games